Ada Louise Powell, maiden name Ada Louise Lessore, was granddaughter to the esteemed Émile Lessore a free hand designer for Wedgwood and sister to the artist Thérèse Lessore. Her father, Jules Lessore, also decorated pottery but was primarily a marine painter, he had exhibitions at the Royal Academy and Paris Salon.
Powell studied calligraphy at the Central School of Arts and Crafts. "She became highly skilled and well known, illuminating some of William Morris’ incomplete work, and extending her interests to decorative designs and the painting of furniture for Ernest Grimson". Ada's artistic interests were therefore very much encouraged by her family and she had many roots to the pottery company Wedgwood. Moreover, her sister, Thérèse Lessore, was a painter and founder member of the London Group  and then also designed for Wedgwood in the 1920s and her brother Frederick was a portrait sculptor who opened the Beaux Arts Gallery. She married  Alfred Hoare Powell on Thursday, 6 September 1906 who then became her artistic partner within her career also.

Career
After her marriage to  Powell the couple pursued  a career with Wedgwood together after setting up their studio in 1907 at 20 Red Lion Square in Bloomsbury, London. Wedgwood sought to offer a new product range which, after its success, lead to the couple receiving money towards a studio to work, two assistants in London and a studio in the Wedgwood factory. Their brief was to developed the art wares within the company. Their progressive style was sought by the company to mass-produce works which coincided with the arts and crafts movement. Some of their work was jointly signed however a lot of her work was individual as she preferred calligraphic and heraldic motifs. The couple were well known in the field of the arts and exhibited in many events such as: Arts and Crafts Exhibition at Grafton Galleries, 1906; Hampstead Exhibition, 1914; Decorative Arts of Great Britain and Ireland Exhibition at the Louvre, 1914; the Paris Exhibition, 1925 as well as yearly in their studio.

Powell suggested the reintroduction of classic eighteenth century designs into a new Wedgwood collection hosted in Liverpool, which led to a lot of external approval and proved to be a commercial success, with the Staffordshire Sentinel commenting on their 'fresh style of decorated pottery'. The patterns included; 'Vine', 'Oak Leaf', and 'Crimped Ribbon and Wreath' and were sold to famous retailers such as Dunbar Hay and Harrods. Most of her designs were hand painted and a lot of her patterns were derived from nature in a calligraphic fashion. Some of her designs were extremely complex and required modification by the art director at the time but were critically acclaimed by many.

References

People from Southwick, West Sussex
1865 births
1956 deaths
English calligraphers
Women calligraphers
Wedgwood pottery